Wangerberg (also spelled Wangerbärg) is a village of Liechtenstein, located in the municipality of Triesenberg.

Geography
The village lies on a hill in front of Triesen, 2 km south of Triesenberg. It is crossed by the creek Dorfbach.

References

Villages of Liechtenstein